Sean Bailey (born 15 July 1997) is a Jamaican athlete.

From Spanish Town, Jamaica and a former St Jago High School athlete, Bailey moved on to competing for the University of Texas-El Paso where he made the NCAA 400 metres final in 2021 before injuring his hamstring in the race.

Bailey clocked 45.04 seconds to win the men’s 400 metres at the Jamaican Olympic Trials. He was named in the Jamaican Olympic team for the delayed 2020 Summer Games in Tokyo having qualified through his world ranking. In Tokyo, Bailey participated in the mixed 4 x 400m relay and finished seventh in the final.

References

1997 births
Living people
Jamaican male sprinters
Place of birth missing (living people)
Jamaican Athletics Championships winners
UTEP Miners men's track and field athletes
Athletes (track and field) at the 2020 Summer Olympics
Olympic athletes of Jamaica
People from Spanish Town
20th-century Jamaican people
21st-century Jamaican people